The Oddo–Harkins rule holds that an element with an even atomic number (such as carbon, element 6) is more abundant than both elements with the adjacently larger and smaller odd atomic numbers (such as boron, element 5, and nitrogen, element 7, respectively, for carbon). This tendency of the abundance of the chemical elements was first reported by Giuseppe Oddo in 1914 and William Draper Harkins in 1917.

Definition

All atoms bigger than hydrogen are formed in stars or supernovae through nucleosynthesis, when gravity, temperature and pressure reach levels high enough to fuse protons and neutrons together. Protons and neutrons form the atomic nucleus, which accumulates electrons to form atoms. The number of protons in the nucleus, called atomic number, uniquely identifies a chemical element.

The Oddo–Harkins rule argues that elements with odd atomic numbers have one unpaired proton and are more likely to capture another, thus increasing their atomic number. It is possible that in elements with even atomic numbers, protons are paired, with each member of the pair balancing the spin of the other; even parity thus enhances nucleon stability.

Exceptions to the rule
This postulate, however, does not apply to the universe's most abundant, and simplest element from the periodic table of elements: hydrogen, with an atomic number of 1. This may be because, in its ionized form, a hydrogen atom becomes a single proton, of which is theorized to have been one of the first major conglomerates of quarks during the initial second of the Universe's inflation period, following the Big Bang. In this period, when inflation of the universe had brought it from an infinitesimal point to about the size of a modern galaxy, temperatures in the particle soup fell from over a trillion degrees to several million degrees.

This period allowed for the fusion of single protons and deuterium nuclei to form helium and lithium nuclei but was too short for every H+ ion to be reconstituted into heavier elements. In this case, helium, atomic number 2, remains the even numbered counterpart to hydrogen. Thus, neutral hydrogen—or hydrogen paired with an electron, the only stable lepton—constituted the vast majority of the remaining unannihilated portions of matter following the conclusion of inflation.

Another exception to the rule is beryllium, which, even with an even atomic number (4) is more rare than the odd number elements to either side of it (lithium and boron). This is because most of the universe's lithium, beryllium, and boron are made by cosmic ray spallation, not ordinary stellar nucleosynthesis, and beryllium has only one stable isotope, causing it to lag in abundance with regard to its neighbors, which both have two stable isotopes.

Relationship to fusion
The pattern arises after the runaway fusion in a dying massive star occurs, in which a given mass of the various even and odd numbered elements are formed by a slightly greater mass of the elements hydrogen and helium.  The newly formed elements are ejected in the explosion and eventually join the rest of the galaxy's interstellar medium.

When fusion occurs with larger and larger nuclei, the energy input becomes increasingly larger and the energy output becomes increasingly smaller; the point at which these two potentials meet on the periodic table of elements is somewhere around the elements iron, atomic number 26, and nickel, atomic number 28. Fusion of heavier elements than this does not release energy, and so the probability of finding discrepancies in the Oddo–Harkins rule becomes lower.

See also

References

Nuclear chemistry